An intumescent is a substance that swells as a result of heat exposure, leading to an increase in volume and decrease in density. Intumescence refers to the process of swelling. Intumescent materials are typically used in passive fire protection and require listing, approval, and compliance in their installed configurations in order to comply with the national building codes and laws.

The details for individual building parts are specified in technical standards which are compiled and published by national or international standardization bodies like the British Standards Institute (BSI), the German Institute for Standardization (DIN), the American Society for Testing and Materials (ASTM) or the International Organization for Standardization (ISO).

Intumescent coatings for steel constructions must be approved in standardized fire tests.

Types

Soft char
These intumescent materials produce a light char which is a poor conductor of heat, thus retarding heat transfer. Typically the light char consist of microporous carbonaceous foam formed by a chemical reaction of three main components: ammonium polyphosphate, pentaerythritol tetranitrate, and melamine. The reaction takes place in a matrix formed by the molten binder which is typically based on vinyl acetate copolymers or styrene acrylates.

Ablative coatings contain a significant amount of hydrates. When the hydrates are heated, they decompose, and water vapour is released, which has a cooling effect. Once the water is spent, the insulation characteristics of the char that remains can retard heat transfer through the fire stop assembly.

Soft char products are typically used in thin film intumescent materials for fireproofing protection of structural steel as well as in firestop pillows.

Hard char
Harder char is produced with sodium silicates and graphite. These products are suitable for use in plastic pipe firestops in which applications it is necessary to exert expansion pressure to fill the gap left in the middle of the fire stop assembly left by the melting plastic pipe.

Intumescent coatings
Intumescent coatings may be designed for protection of metals from fire, such as structural steel. Reviews of the technology are available. They may be based on a number of resin binders including epoxy, and silicone. Melamine-formaldehyde resin systems have been used using layered double-hydroxide modified phosphate esters that improved the intumescent properties.

Problems
Some intumescent materials are susceptible to environmental influences such as humidity, which can reduce or negate their ability to function.

Gallery

See also

 Fire test
 Fire-resistance rating
 Hydrate
 Fire protection
 Passive fire protection
 Firestops
 Putty
 Fireproofing
 Firestop pillow
 Endothermic
 Sodium silicate
 Graphite
 Penetrant (mechanical, electrical, or structural)
 Listing_and_approval_use_and_compliance
 Construction
 Black snake (firework)
 Starlite

References

External links
"The proof is in the fire" Chemical Innovation Magazine, American Chemical Society
Article about intumescent materials
Translation of DIBt test procedure for intumescent building products
Translation of DIBt test procedure for reactive spray fireproofing materials
American Chemical Society: Fire Retardancy of Polypropylene Composites Using Intumescent Coatings
ASTM E 2786 - 2010 Standard Test Methods for Measuring Expansion of Intumescent Materials Used in Firestop and Joint Systems

Materials
Firestops